Nils Skulbru (born 20 July 1938 in Akkarvik, Norway) is a Canadian former cross-country skier who competed in the 1968 Winter Olympics.

References

1938 births
Living people
Canadian male cross-country skiers
Olympic cross-country skiers of Canada
Cross-country skiers at the 1968 Winter Olympics
People from Troms
Norwegian emigrants to Canada